The Figaro Bénéteau designed by Jean-Marie Finot in 1990, and project managed by Jean Berret.

References

Keelboats
Sailboat types built by Beneteau
Sailboat types built in France
Sailboat type designs by Groupe Finot
1990s sailboat type designs
Beneteau